1252 Celestia, provisional designation , is a stony asteroid from the Palladian region, located in the central asteroid belt. It was discovered on 19 February 1933, by astronomer Fred Whipple at the Oak Ridge Observatory operated by the Center for Astrophysics  Harvard & Smithsonian in Massachusetts, United States. It was named after the discoverer's mother, Celestia MacFarland Whipple.

Orbit and classification 

According to a synthetic HCM-analysis by Nesvorný, Celestia is a member of the Pallas family, a small asteroid family of less than 200 known members with inclined orbits. The family is named after 2 Pallas. However, in a HCM-analysis by Milani and Knežević, Celestia belongs to the background population.

The asteroid orbits the Sun in the central main-belt at a distance of 2.1–3.3 AU once every 4 years and 5 months (1,615 days; semi-major axis of 2.69 AU). Its orbit has an eccentricity of 0.21 and an inclination of 34° with respect to the ecliptic. The body's observation arc begins at the Yerkes Observatory in April 1933, or two months after its official discovery observation at Oak Ridge.

Naming 

This minor planet was named after the mother of the discoverer, Celestia MacFarland Whipple. The official  was mentioned in The Names of the Minor Planets by Paul Herget in 1955.

Physical characteristics 

In the Tholen and SMASS classification, Celestia is a common stony S-type asteroid, while in SMASS-like taxonomy of the Small Solar System Objects Spectroscopic Survey (S3OS2), it is a Sl-subtype that transitions from the S-type to the L-type asteroids. Celestia stony spectral type does not agree with those determined for the members of the Pallas family, which are typically "bright" carbonaceous B-type asteroids.

Rotation period 

In February and March 1195, a rotational lightcurve of Celestia was obtained from photometric observations at the Paul Feder Observatory by Walter Worman of Moorhead State University. Lightcurve analysis gave a rotation period of 10.636 hours with a brightness amplitude of 0.26 magnitude. An alternative period determination by René Roy of 12 hours was based on a fragmentary lightcurve and received a poor rating.

Diameter and albedo 

According to the surveys carried out by the Infrared Astronomical Satellite IRAS, the Japanese Akari satellite and the NEOWISE mission of NASA's Wide-field Infrared Survey Explorer, Celestia measures between 17.39 and 21.56 kilometers in diameter and its surface has an albedo between 0.167 and 0.2573. The Collaborative Asteroid Lightcurve Link adopts the results obtained by IRAS, that is, an albedo of 0.2573 and a diameter of 17.39 kilometers based on an absolute magnitude of 10.89.

References

External links 
 Asteroid Lightcurve Database (LCDB), query form (info )
 Dictionary of Minor Planet Names, Google books
 Asteroids and comets rotation curves, CdR – Observatoire de Genève, Raoul Behrend
 Discovery Circumstances: Numbered Minor Planets (1)-(5000) – Minor Planet Center
 
 

001252
Named minor planets
001252
001252
19330219